BRICS Games 2021 is going to be organised by India, which will be aligned with the Khelo India Games scheduled for the same year. This announcement was made by the Indian Minister of Sports and Youth Affairs, Kiren Rijiju at the meeting of Sports Ministers of the BRICS nations. India holds the chairmanship of the five-nation independent international group in 2021. The games will be held during the same time and at the same venues as of Khelo India Games 2021 will have the benefit of witnessing BRICS Games from close quarters.

External links

 BRICS Universities League
 BRICS Cable

References

BRICS
Sport in Brazil
Sport in Russia
Sport in India
Sport in China
Sport in South Africa
Organizations established in 2009